Kaj Schmidt (born 20 April 1926) is a Danish sprint canoer who competed in the early 1960s. He finished fifth in the K-2 1000 m event at the 1960 Summer Olympics in Rome. In the K-2 he competed together with his brother Vagn Schmidt.

References

External links
 

1926 births
Canoeists at the 1960 Summer Olympics
Danish male canoeists
Olympic canoeists of Denmark
Possibly living people